Benton High School is a public high school located in Benton, Louisiana, United States. The school, part of Bossier Parish School Board, serves about 1200 students in grades 9 to 12.

History
The first school was built in 1890, and the current school was opened in 1978.  Benton High School opened its new campus fall 2019.

Athletics
Benton High School is a member of the Louisiana High School Athletic Association in the highest classification, 5A, moving up from 4A for the 2019–20 school year.

Notable alumni
Walter O. Bigby (Class of 1944), member of the Louisiana House of Representatives (19681979); thereafter a judge until his death

References

External links
Benton High School website
Benton High School History website
Bossier Parish School website

Schools in Bossier Parish, Louisiana
Public high schools in Louisiana
Buildings and structures completed in 1978
Educational institutions established in 1890
1890 establishments in Louisiana